Kosmos 1409 ( meaning Cosmos 1409) was a Soviet US-K missile early warning satellite which was launched in 1982 as part of the Soviet military's Oko programme. Kosmos 1409 replaced Kosmos 1217 as part of the Oko constellation of satellites and covered the plane 2 - 317° longitude of ascending node.

Mission 
The satellite was designed to identify missile launches using optical telescopes and infrared sensors.

Launch 
Kosmos 1409 was launched from Site 16/2 from Plesetsk Cosmodrome in Soviet Union. A Molniya-M launch vehicle with a Blok 2BL upper stage was used to perform the launch, which took place at 06:23:11 UTC on 22 September 1982. The launch successfully placed the satellite into a Molniya orbit. It subsequently received its Kosmos designation, and the COSPAR International Designator 1982-095A. The United States Space Command assigned it the Satellite Catalog Number 13585.

Atmospheric entry 
It reentered the Earth's atmosphere on 8 June 2009.

See also 

 List of Kosmos satellites (1251–1500)
 List of R-7 launches (1980-1984)
 1982 in spaceflight
 List of Oko satellites

References 

Kosmos satellites
Spacecraft launched in 1982
Oko
Spacecraft launched by Molniya-M rockets
Spacecraft which reentered in 2009